Jonas Nay (born 20 September 1990) is a German actor and musician known for starring as Martin Rauch in Deutschland 83 and its sequels, Deutschland 86 and  Deutschland 89.

Early life 
Jonas Nay was born in Lübeck in 1990 days before the reunification of Germany. An active boy, he rarely watched television growing up preferring to spend his leisure time on his interests of sport and music.

Career 

Because of his interest in the theatre, Nay responded to a newspaper advertisement looking for actors in 2004 and successfully auditioned for a part in the German children's series  on German TV station NDR. In the first two seasons of the television series, Nay portrayed character Otti Sörensen while using the stage name Jonas Friedebom. In the following years, he played minor roles in several television productions on German television stations ARD and ZDF.

After finishing school, Nay took the lead role in the TV film Homevideo, a drama about a teenage boy bullied by his classmates, who shared a video of him masturbating. The production was awarded Best TV film at the 2011 German Television Awards. Nay himself received a German Television Award, as well as a 2012  Award, for his role. This work was followed by other leading roles in TV films. In 2012, Nay had a role as Hamburg investigator Cenk Batu in Tatort: , about a disturbed serial killer who is killed by his mother in the heat of the moment. For his role as the son of a schizophrenic in the 2013 film , he was awarded the Bavarian Film Award in 2013 as "Best Newcomer."

He founded the band Concerted with other students at the  he had attended in his adolescence, in which he sang, played guitar and piano, and wrote the lyrics. The band worked on music for the Stephan Rick film The Good Neighbour in January 2013. The result was the forming of the new band Northern Lights.

In 2015, Nay starred as Martin Rauch, an East German spy, in the Cold War thriller Deutschland 83, the first German-language TV series shown on American television, and later its 2018 and 2020 sequels, Deutschland 86 and Deutschland 89. He reached a certain level of international recognition for this role being interviewed by multiple media outlets in the United Kingdom and United States.  

Nay sings and plays the keyboard for the band Pudeldame.

In February 2021, it was announced that Nay had been cast alongside actor Elyas M'Barek in the film 1000 Zeilen (1000 Lines), a thriller based on the book Tausend Zeilen Lüge. Das System Relotius und der deutsche Journalismus by Juan Moreno about the 2018 Fake news scandal which involved former journalist Claas Relotius from Der Spiegel.

Filmography 
 2005–06:  (TV series)
 2007:  (TV series)
 2007:  (TV series)
 2008:  (TV series)
 2009:  (TV series)
 2009:  (short film)
 2011:  (TV series)
 2011: Homevideo (TV film)
 2011:  (TV film)
 2012: Tatort:  (Crime Scene: The Ballad of Cenk and Valerie)
 2012:  (TV film)
 2012: Tatort: 
 2013:  (TV film)
 2013:  (TV film)
 2013:  (film)
 2013:  (TV film)
 2014:  (film)
 2014: Dear Courtney (film)
 2015:  (TV film)
 2015: We Are Young. We Are Strong (film)
 2015: Unser letzter Sommer (Summer Solstice) (film)
 2015: Deutschland 83 (TV series)
 2016:  (TV film)
 2018: Deutschland 86 (TV series)
 2019: The Master Butcher (TV series)
 2020: Deutschland 89 (TV series)
 2020: Persian Lessons (film)
 2021: Ein Hauch von Amerika (TV series) 
 2021: The Four of Us
 TBA: 1000 Zeilen (1000 Lines) (film)

Awards 
 2011: German Television Awards, Award for Homevideo
 2012:  Award for Homevideo
 2012: New Faces Award for Homevideo
 2012:  Award for Homevideo
 2014: Bavarian Film Award in 2013 as best young actor for 
 2016: German Television Awards, Best Actor Award for Deutschland 83, Tannbach

References

External links 

 

1990 births
Living people
Actors from Lübeck
21st-century German male actors